"Electric Boogie" (also known as the "Electric Slide") is a dance song written and originally recorded in 1976 with Bunny Wailer.

History
It is strongly associated with the "Electric Slide" line dance and has since become a celebratory staple. The song was very popular in North America at weddings, bar and bat mitzvahs, and other special occasions in the 1990s.

Marcia Griffiths recording
The most successful recording was performed by Marcia Griffiths. Griffiths' recording of "Electric Boogie" was originally released in 1983; while this version did not catch on internationally, a remixed version featured on her album Carousel reached number 51 on the US Billboard Hot 100 in 1990. This version was also a minor hit on the Hot Black Singles chart, peaking at number 78.

See also
Electric boogaloo (disambiguation)

References

1976 songs
1983 singles
Electronic songs
Songs about dancing